UMBC Training Centers is an extension of the University of Maryland, Baltimore County (UMBC) established in 2000 at UMBC's South Campus in Catonsville, Maryland. UMBC Training Centers provides technical and professional training programs remotely and directly at three campuses to individuals, groups, corporations, and government agencies around the country. The school's administrative offices are located at the Columbia campus at the Columbia Gateway Business Park.

The center partners with numerous educational institutions and organizations including the American Council on Education
Bowie State University, University of Maryland, Baltimore County (UMBC), University of Maryland, University College (UMUC), and the University System of Maryland (USM).

Programs

 Big Data Analytics
 Cybersecurity
 Engineering
 Human Resources
 Information Technology
 Leadership & Innovation
 Project Management
 Sonography

References

External links

University of Maryland, Baltimore County
Arts, Humanities and Social Sciences
Educational institutions established in 2000
2000 establishments in Maryland